Philomena, also known as Saint Philomena or Philomena of Rome, was a young virgin martyr whose remains were discovered on May 24–25, 1802, in the Catacomb of Priscilla. Three tiles enclosing the tomb bore an inscription,  (i.e. "Peace be unto you, Philomena"), that was taken to indicate that her name (in the Latin of the inscription) was Filumena, the English form of which is Philomena. Philomena is the patron saint of infants, babies, and youth, and is known as "The Wonder Worker".

The remains were moved to Mugnano del Cardinale in 1805. There, they became the focus of widespread devotion; several miracles were credited to Philomena's intercession, including the healing of Pauline Jaricot in 1835, which received wide publicity. John Vianney attributed to her intercession the extraordinary cures that others attributed to himself.

From 1837 to 1961, celebration of her liturgical feast was approved for some places, but was never included in the General Roman Calendar for universal use. The 1920 typical edition of the Roman Missal included a mention of her, under August 11, in the section headed  ("Masses for some places"), with an indication that the Mass to be used in those places was one from the common of a virgin martyr, without any collect proper to the saint.

Biography
On December 21, 1833, the Holy Office declared that there was nothing contrary to the Catholic faith in the revelations that Sister Maria Luisa di Gesù (1799–1875), a Dominican tertiary from Naples, claimed to have received from Philomena herself.

According to Gesù, Philomena told her she was the daughter of a king in Greece who, with his wife, had converted to Christianity. At the age of about 13, she took a vow of virginity for Christ's sake. When the Emperor Diocletian threatened to make war on her father, her father went with his family to Rome to ask for peace. The Emperor "fell in love" with the young Philomena and, when she refused to be his wife, subjected her to a series of torments: scourging, from whose effects two angels cured her; drowning with an anchor attached to her (two angels cut the rope and raised her to the river bank); and being shot with arrows (on the first occasion her wounds were healed; on the second, the arrows turned aside; and on the third, they returned and killed six of the archers, after which several of the others became Christians). Finally, the Emperor had her decapitated. The story goes that the decapitation occurred on a Friday at three in the afternoon, as with the death of Jesus. The two anchors, three arrows, the palm, and the ivy leaf on the tiles found in the tomb were interpreted as symbols of her martyrdom.

In the Neapolitan nun's account, Philomena also revealed that her birthday was January 10, that her martyrdom occurred on August 10 (the date also of the arrival of her relics in Mugnano del Cardinale), and that her name "Filumena" meant "daughter of light" (from Latin "filia" and "lumen;" however, it is usually taken to be derived from Greek φιλουμένη philouménē (hence Latin "u" for "ου") meaning "beloved."). Publication of this account gave rise to critical study both of the account itself and of the many archaeological finds, leading to uncertainty that her supposed tomb was in fact that of a martyr.

Discovery of her remains
On May 24, 1802, in the Catacombs of Priscilla on the Via Salaria Nova, an inscribed loculus (space hollowed out of the rock) was found, and on the following day it was carefully examined and opened. The loculus was closed with three terracotta tiles, on which was the following inscription: lumena paxte cumfi. It was and is generally accepted that the tiles had not been positioned in the sequence of the words, and that the inscription originally read, with the leftmost tile placed on the right: pax tecum Filumena ("Peace with you, Philomena"). Within the loculus was found the skeleton of a female between thirteen and fifteen years old. Embedded in the cement was a small glass phial with vestiges of what was taken to be blood. In accordance with the assumptions of the time, the remains were taken to be those of a virgin martyr named Philomena.

The belief that such vials were signs of the grave of a martyr was still held in 1863, when a December 10 decree of the Sacred Congregation of Rites confirmed a decree of April 10, 1868. But this view has been rejected in practice since the investigations of Giovanni Battista De Rossi (1822–1894).

In 1805, Canon Francesco De Lucia of Mugnano del Cardinale requested relics for his oratory, and on 8 June obtained the remains discovered in May 1802 (reduced to dust and fragments). The relics arrived in Mugnano on August 10, and were placed in the Church of Our Lady of Grace. A new Church of Our Lady of Grace was built, containing a chapel where the sacred relics were moved on September 29, 1805.

In 1827, Pope Leo XII gave to the church in Mugnano del Cardinale the three inscribed terracotta slabs that had been taken from the tomb.

Spread of devotion
In his Relazione istorica della traslazione del sagro corpo di s. Filomena da Roma a Mugnano del Cardinale, written in 1833, Canon De Lucia recounted that wonders accompanied the arrival of the relics in his church, among them a statue that sweated some liquid continuously for three days.

A miracle accepted as proved in the same year was the multiplication of the bone dust of the saint, which provided for hundreds of reliquaries without the original amount experiencing any decrease in quantity.

Devotion includes the wearing of the "Cord of Philomena", a red and white cord, which had a number of indulgences attached to it, including a plenary indulgence on the day on which the cord was worn for the first time, indulgences that were not renewed in Indulgentiarum doctrina, the 1967 general revision of the discipline concerning them. There is also the chaplet of Saint Philomena, with three white beads in honour of the Blessed Trinity and thirteen red beads in honour of the thirteen years of Philomena's life. A sacramental associated with the hallow is the Oil of Saint Philomena, which is used for the healing of the body and soul.

Canonization

On January 30, 1837, in the aftermath of the cure of Pauline Jaricot, Pope Gregory XVI authorized liturgical celebration of Philomena on August 11 or, according to another source, originally on September 9, first in the Diocese of Nola (to which Mugnano del Cardinale belongs), and soon in several other dioceses in Italy.

On January 31, 1855, Pope Pius IX approved a proper Mass and office dedicated to Saint Philomena with confirmation of the decree Etsi Decimo (Rescript of the Sacred Congregation of Rites, Papal Confirmation of Promotor of the Faith Brief Etsi decimo as submitted by Rev. Andrea Fratini, 31 January 1855).

In August 1876, the first issue of Messenger of Saint Philomena was published in Paris, France. On October 6, 1876, Father Louis Petit founded the Confraternity of Saint Philomena in Paris. In November 1886, the Confraternity was raised to the rank of Archconfraternity by Pope Leo XIII. On May 21, 1912, Pope Pius X raised it to the rank of Universal Archconfraternity with the Apostolic Brief Pias Fidelium Societates stating, with regard to the historical authenticity of Philomena, that: "The current statements (regarding St. Philomena) are and remain always fixed, valid and effective; in this way it has to be judged as normative; and if it is proceeded in another way, it will be null and void, whatever its authority".

The name Philomena was not included in the Roman Martyrology, the official list of saints recognized by the Catholic Church and in which the saints are included immediately upon canonization. In the 1920 typical edition of the Roman Missal Philomena is mentioned, under August 11 (with an indication that the Mass for her feastday was to be taken entirely from the common, so that there was no part, not even the collect, that was proper to her) in the section headed "Masses for some places", i.e. only those places for which it had been specially authorized.

On February 14, 1961, the Holy See ordered that the name of Philomena be removed from all liturgical calendars that mentioned her. This order was given as part of an instruction on the application to local calendars of the principles enunciated in the 1960 Code of Rubrics, which had already been applied to the General Roman Calendar. Section 33 of this document ordered the removal from local calendars of fourteen named feasts, but allowed them to be retained in places that had a special link with the feast. It then added: "However, the feast of Saint Philomena, virgin and martyr (11 August), is to be removed from all calendars." No suspension or prohibition of the Archconfraternity was issued.

Veneration by other saints
 The spread of devotion to her in France as well as in Italy was helped when John Vianney built a shrine in her honour and referred to her often, attributing to her the miracles that others attributed to himself.
 Another help was the cure of the near-dying Pauline Jaricot, founder of the Society for the Propagation of the Faith, at Philomena's shrine on August 10, 1835. On July 6, 1835, the Miracle of Giovanna Cescutti took place in Venice.
 Damien of Molokai, who had strong devotion to Philomena, named his church at Kalawao in honor of her.
 Many other saints were devoted to Philomena, including Peter Julian Eymard, Peter Chanel, Anthony Mary Claret, Madelaine Sophie Barat, Euphrasier Pelletier, John Neumann and Anna Maria Taigi.

Criticism
Although correlation does not prove causation, the Holy See's instruction to remove the name of Philomena even from local calendars followed the raising of questions by certain scholars, whose interest had been drawn to the phenomenon more especially in connection with the revelations of Sister Maria Luisa di Gesù. The questions were raised in particular by Orazio Marucchi, whose conclusions won the support of Johann Peter Kirsch, an archaeologist and ecclesiastical historian who is the author of the article on Philomena in the Catholic Encyclopedia. However, according to Mark Miravalle the conclusions have been rejected by others. Historian Michael S. Carter (who supports Miravalle's position) has written about devotion to Saint Philomena within the broader context of veneration of "catacomb martyrs" and their relics in the history of the United States.

The inscription on the three tiles that had provided the Latin name "Filumena" belonged to the middle or second half of the second century, while the body that had been found was of the fourth century, when the persecutions of Christians had ended. Not only the name but also the leaf, the two anchors and the palm that decorated the three tiles, and which had been believed to indicate that Filumena was a martyr (though the necessary connection between these symbols and martyrdom has been denied), had no relation to the person whose remains were found. The disarrangement of the tiles was something fourth-century sextons regularly did when re-using materials already engraved, with the aim of indicating that it was not the same person who was now buried in the place.

In April 2005, at the Conference of Philomenian Studies – 1805-2005, findings of a study carried out on the tiles by the Opificio delle Pietre Dure e Laboratori di Restauro (Factory of Hard Stones and Restoration Laboratories) of Florence were made public. The analysis confirmed that only one type of mortal lime could be found on the tiles, thus giving strong support to the theory that the tiles had not been re-arranged.

The rector of the shrine in Mugnano del Cardinale disputes these findings. After reporting the decision of the Sacred Congregation of Rites in 1961 as resulting from the studies of scholars, the Italian-language Enciclopedia Dei Santi says that there still remain the miracles that occurred and the official recognition that the Catholic Church gave in the nineteenth century, the personal devotion to Saint Philomena of popes and people who were later canonized, and the widespread general devotion that still persists, particularly at Mugnano del Cardinale in the Diocese of Nola, where pilgrims from all over the world arrive continually, giving a display of intense popular devotion.

The website of "The National Shrine of Saint Philomena, Miami, Florida" sees "the action taken in 1960 as the work of the devil in order to deprive the people of God of a most powerful Intercessor, particularly in the areas of purity and faith at a time when these virtues were so much being challenged as they continue to be up until now!"

Status

In his book It Is Time to Meet St Philomena, Mark Miravalle says that Pope Gregory XVI "liturgically canonized St. Philomena, in an act of the ordinary Papal Magisterium". This contrasts with the usual view that canonization is an exercise of infallible magisterium declaring a truth that must be "definitively held".

The Roman Martyrology contains the names of all the saints who have been formally canonized, since "with the canonization of a new saint, that person is officially listed in the catalog of saints, or Martyrology", and "as soon as the beatification or canonization event takes place, the person's name is technically part of the Roman Martyrology". It does not now contain and in fact never included the name of this Philomena, which can be seen to be absent in the 1856 edition published some twenty years after the 1837 decree.

Canonization is a ceremony of the highest solemnity, in which the Pope himself, invoking his supreme authority in the Catholic Church, declares that someone is a saint and inserts that person's name in the catalog of saints. This ceremony has never taken place with regard to Saint Philomena.

See also

Places dedicated to Saint Philomena:
 Sanctuary of St. Philomena, Mugnano del Cardinale, Avellino, Italy, which houses her remains within a life-size, richly robed effigy
 St. Philomena's Cathedral (India)
 St. Philomena's Church (Cincinnati, Ohio)
 St. Philomena's Church (Pittsburgh, PA)
 St Philomena's Catholic High School for Girls
 St. Philomena's Roman Catholic Church (Franklinville, NY)
 Sanctuary of St. Philomena (Sorocaba, SP, Brazil) 
 St. Philomena's Catholic Church and School (Peoria, Illinois)
 St. Philomena's Catholic Church (Monticello, IL)

References

Bibliography
Sister Marie Helene Mohr, S.C., Saint Philomena, Powerful with God, Rockford, IL: TAN Books and Publishers, Inc, 1988.
Philomena in David Hugh Farmer, The Oxford Dictionary of Saints, (Oxford University Press, 2004) 
Dr Mark Miravalle, Present Ecclesial Status of Devotion to St. Philomena, (Queenship Publishing, 2002)  (also on Internet: see below)
Cecily Hallack. Saint Philomena: Virgin martyr and wonderworker. Dublin, Ireland; Anthonian Press, 1936
Alfonso Ramos. Santa Filomena: Princesa del cielo. Chihuahua, Mexico; Ultimo Sello, 2013.
Michael S. Carter, "Glowing With the Radiance of Heaven: Roman Martyrs, American Saints, and the Devotional World of Nineteenth-Century American Catholicism. U.S. Catholic Historian, Volume 36, Number 1 (Winter 2018), pp. 1–26

External links

Johann Peter Kirsch, "St. Philomena" in Catholic Encyclopedia (New York 1911)
David Farmer, "Philomena" in The Oxford Dictionary of Saints, Fifth Revised Edition (Oxford University Press 2011 )
Dr Mark Miravalle, Present Ecclesial Status of Devotion to St. Philomena, 2002, Retrieved March 12, 2013
Sanctuary of St. Philomena in Mugnano del Cardinale, Italy
St. Philomena the Wonderworker by Father Paul O’Sullivan, O.P. (E.D.M)
Litany to Saint Philomena
Catholic Tradition Saint Philomena
List of Places Devoted to Saint Philomena

291 births
304 deaths
3rd-century Roman women
4th-century Roman women
4th-century Christian martyrs
Christian child saints
Christian hagiography
Ante-Nicene Christian martyrs
Saints from Roman Greece
Italian saints
Ancient Corcyrans
Late Ancient Christian female saints
Miracle workers
Christians martyred during the reign of Diocletian